In mathematics, the prime decomposition theorem for 3-manifolds states that every compact, orientable 3-manifold is the connected sum of a unique (up to homeomorphism) finite collection of prime 3-manifolds.

A manifold is prime if it cannot be presented as a connected sum of more than one manifold, none of which is the sphere of the same dimension. This condition is necessary since for any manifold M of dimension  it is true that

or it is irreducible, which means that any embedded 2-sphere bounds a ball.

The prime decomposition holds also for non-orientable 3-manifolds, but the uniqueness statement must be modified slightly: every compact, non-orientable 3-manifold is a connected sum of irreducible 3-manifolds and non-orientable  bundles over   This sum is unique as long as we specify that each summand is either irreducible or a non-orientable  bundle over 

The proof is based on normal surface techniques originated by Hellmuth Kneser.  Existence was proven by Kneser, but the exact formulation and proof of the uniqueness was done more than 30 years later by John Milnor.

References 

 

3-manifolds
Manifolds
Theorems in differential geometry